Hans Gösta Klinga (born 17 April 1949) is a Swedish stage and film actor and film director. He won the Eugene O'Neill Award in 2009.

External links

Hans Klinga on the Royal Dramatic Theatre's website

Swedish male actors
1949 births
Living people
Swedish film directors
Swedish television directors
People from Västerås
Eugene O'Neill Award winners
Ek family